The 1938 Swedish Ice Hockey Championship was the 17th season of the Swedish Ice Hockey Championship, the national championship of Sweden. AIK won the championship.

Tournament

Quarterfinals 
 Södertälje IF - IK Hermes 2:0
 AIK - IFK Mariefred 7:1
 IK Göta - Södertälje SK 2:0
 Hammarby IF - Karlbergs BK 1:0

Semifinals
 Södertälje IF - AIK 0:4
 IK Göta - Hammarby IF 1:2

Final 
 AIK - Hammarby IF 2:0

External links
 Season on hockeyarchives.info

Cham
Swedish Ice Hockey Championship seasons